Samuel Morgan (1798–1880) was an American businessman, builder, and manufacturer.

Sam or Sammy Morgan may also refer to:
 Sam Morgan (musician) (1895–1936), New Orleans jazz band musician & bandleader
 Sam Morgan (entrepreneur) (born 1975), New Zealand businessman
Sammy Morgan (footballer) (born 1946), Northern Irish footballer
Samuel Morgan (cricketer) (born 1950), Jamaican cricketer
Sammy Morgan (fighter) (born 1981), martial arts fighter
Sam Morgan (General Hospital), a character on General Hospital